Megacara is a genus of parasitoid wasps belonging to the family Ichneumonidae. The species of this genus are found in Europe and Northern America.

Species 
Megacara includes the following species:
 Megacara abdominalis Sheng, 2000 
 Megacara hortulana (Gravenhorst, 1829)

References

Ichneumonidae
Ichneumonidae genera
Insects described in 1970